Ginevra Sforza (144016 May 1507) was the wife and counselor of Giovanni II Bentivoglio, lord of Bologna.

Birth and first marriage

Ginevra Sforza was born in Ancona in 1440, the illegitimate daughter of Alessandro Sforza, Lord of Pesaro. She married Sante Bentivoglio, a cousin of Giovanni II Bentivoglio, on 19 May 1454 at the church of San Giacomo Maggiore. She gave her first husband two children: 
 Constance (1458–1491), who married Antonmaria Pico della Mirandola, and 
 Ercole Bentivoglio (1459–1507), a condottiero, who married Barbara Torelli.

Second marriage

In 1463 Ginevra became a widow, and a year later married Giovanni II Bentivoglio, becoming among other things, his counsellor. Probably a relationship already existed between the two. Ginevra had sixteen children with her husband, of whom five died in infancy. The others were:

Annibale II Bentivoglio (1469–1540) who married Lucrezia, daughter of Ercole I d'Este, and who was lord of Bologna from 1511 to 1512;
Ermes Bentivoglio (1475–1513)
Alessandro Bentivoglio (1474–1532), who married Ippolita Sforza;
Camilla, a nun at Corpus Christi
Isotta, a nun at Corpus Christi
Francesca, married to Galeotto Manfredi
Antongaleazzo Bentivoglio, prelate
Eleonora
Laura, wife of Giovanni Gonzaga
Violante, wife of Pandolfo IV Malatesta
Bianca

Ginevra befriended Gentile Budrioli, wife of the notary Alessandro Cimieri and student at the University of Bologna, 
who was accused of witchcraft and burned at the stake in 1498.

In 1466 Pope Paul II acknowledged the lordship of Giovanni II and gave him the papal vicariate of Bologna.
After facing a conspiracy by the Malvezzi family in 1488, in 1501 the Bentivoglio discovered another conspiracy organized by the rival family of Marescotti. 
On the advice of Ginevra, many family members were killed in revenge.

Exile and death

In 1505 the conspirators who had escaped the carnage petitioned Pope Julius II, who ordered Giovanni II to leave the city with his family. 
Ginevra, exiled in Parma, where she had taken refuge with the Marquis Pallavicini, 
was excommunicated because she had not gone far enough from Bologna.
Julius II refused to reverse the excommunication, despite numerous pleas, or to return the castle of Ponte Poledrano (now Castello di Bentivoglio), of which he had taken possession. The Bentivoglio properties in Bologna were looted and the Palazzo Bentivoglio was razed.

Ginevra died on 16 May 1507 and her body was buried in a common grave near Busseto.
Giovanni II died the next year.

Notes and references
Citations

Sources

1440 births
1507 deaths
15th-century Italian nobility
16th-century Italian nobility
Bentivoglio family
Ginevra
Italian art patrons
15th-century Italian women
People excommunicated by the Catholic Church
16th-century Italian women